Sherten Wimbert Ramiro Apostel (born March 11, 1999) is a Curaçaoan professional baseball third baseman and first baseman who is a free agent. He made his MLB debut in 2020 for the Texas Rangers.

Career

Pittsburgh Pirates
Apostel signed with the Pittsburgh Pirates as an international free agent in 2015, for a signing bonus of $200,000. He made his professional debut in 2016 with the DSL Pirates, hitting .205/.308/.275/.583 with one home run and 8 RBI in 48 games. Apostel returned to the DSL Pirates in 2017, hitting .258/.422/.495/.917 with 9 home runs and 48 RBI in 61 games. After spending the first half of the 2018 season in extended spring training, he was assigned to the Bristol Pirates and hit .259/.406/.460/.866 with 7 home runs and 26 RBI in 41 games.

Texas Rangers
Apostel was traded to the Texas Rangers on August 17, 2018, as the PTBNL in the Keone Kela trade. He was assigned to the Spokane Indians of the Class A Short Season Northwest League and hit .351/.469/.459/.929 with one home run and 10 RBI in 12 games. He was also assigned to the Hickory Crawdads of the Class A South Atlantic League to open the 2019 season. There, he turned in a .258/.325/.470/.795 batting line with 15 home runs and 43 RBI over 80 games for Hickory. He was promoted to the Down East Wood Ducks of the Class A-Advanced Carolina League on July 17. He produced a .237/.352/.378/.730 slash line with 4 home runs and 16 RBI for Down East.

Apostel was added to the Rangers' 40–man roster following the 2019 season. He was called up to the major leagues for the first time on September 12, 2020, made his debut that day against the Oakland Athletics and recorded his first hit off of Yusmeiro Petit. Apostel split an injury filled 2021 season between the ACL Rangers of the Rookie-level Arizona Complex League, the Frisco RoughRiders of the Double-A Central, and the Round Rock Express of the Triple-A West, hitting a combined .235/.321/.416/.737 with 10 home runs and 34 RBI. He opened the 2022 season back with Round Rock.

On April 7, 2022, Apostel was designated for assignment. He was outrighted to AAA on April 14. He elected free agency on November 10, 2022.

Personal life
Apostel's brother, Shendrik, is a professional baseball first baseman.

References

External links

1999 births
Living people
People from Willemstad
Curaçao expatriate baseball players in the United States
Dutch people of Curaçao descent
Major League Baseball players from Curaçao
Major League Baseball infielders
Texas Rangers players
Dominican Summer League Pirates players
Curaçao expatriate baseball players in the Dominican Republic
Bristol Pirates players
Arizona Complex League Rangers players
Spokane Indians players
Hickory Crawdads players
Down East Wood Ducks players
Frisco RoughRiders players
Round Rock Express players